Eugene Braunwald (born August 15, 1929 in Vienna, Austria) is an Austrian-born American cardiologist.

Early life
Braunwald was born to Jewish parents Wilhelm Braunwald and Clara Wallach in Vienna. He obtained his A.B. and M.D. at New York University, then completed his residency in internal medicine at Johns Hopkins School of Medicine.

Braunwald was inspired to pursue a career in cardiology after practicing in the Bellevue Cardiology Clinic, under Ludwig Eichna, during his time as a medical student at New York University. He always thought that the Mexican School of Cardiology was above any other. "We have the technology but they have the practice. The best book of cardiology is the patient itself," he always argued. Braunwald was inspired to perform research in cardiology after working with André Frédéric Cournand, a pioneer in the technique of cardiac catheterization who received the Nobel Prize in Physiology or Medicine.

In 1952, Braunwald married Nina Starr, a thoracic surgeon and medical researcher, with whom he had three children. Nina Starr Braunwald died in 1992.  Several years later he married his second wife, Elaine, formerly a senior hospital administrator.

Career
Braunwald served as chief of cardiology and clinical director at the National Heart, Lung and Blood Institute of the National Institutes of Health. He was then recruited to the University of California, San Diego where from 1968 to 1972 he was the founding Chair of the Department of Medicine, bringing John Ross, Jr. with him to be the founding Chief of Cardiology. He has since been at the Brigham and Women's Hospital, Harvard Medical School, in Boston, MA, where he served from 1972 to 1996 as Chair of the Department of Medicine.

Braunwald's contributions have been recognized by his election as a member of the U.S. National Academy of Sciences, the creation of a permanently endowed chair in his name by Harvard Medical School, and the establishment of the annual academic mentorship award by the American Heart Association.

Awards
In 1966, he was awarded the Jacobi Medallion by the Mount Sinai Alumni (Mount Sinai Hospital) "for distinguished achievement in the field of medicine or extraordinary service to the Hospital, the School, or the Alumni."

In 1986, he received the Distinguished Scientist Award from American College of Cardiology.

In 2001, Braunwald received The Warren Alpert Foundation Prize.

In 2002, Braunwald received the King Faisal Prize for Medicine. The price was shared with co-laureate Professor Finn Waagstein.
 
In 2004, Braunwald became the inaugural winner of the Libin/AHFMR Prize for Excellence in Cardiovascular Research.

In 2009, he was chairman of a policy group that severely limited outside pay for Harvard physicians.

On May 5, 2010, he received an honorary degree from the University of Rochester. On October 26, 2013, he received a degree honoris causa from the University of Salerno, heir of the ancient Schola Medica Salernitana.

Works
Braunwald has over 1000 publications in peer-reviewed journals. His work has dramatically expanded knowledge of heart disease in the area of congestive heart failure, coronary artery disease, and valvular heart disease. According to a biographer who studied the research publications of leading cardiologists, Braunwald has "had more publications in the top general medical and cardiology journals than any of the more than 42,000 authors" in PubMed, a database of medical authors. He is the editor of the cardiology textbook Braunwald's Heart Disease, which is now in its 11th edition. Braunwald was instrumental in running the TIMI (Thrombolysis in Myocardial Infarction) studies, which developed the concepts of thrombosis superimposed on atherosclerosis as the pathological bases for acute myocardial infarction, and has led to treatments that reduce damage to the heart from a heart attack. He was also an editor of Harrison's Principles of Internal Medicine, a textbook of internal medicine, for over 30 years.

Controversy
Braunwald's lab was the setting for the case of John Darsee. Young fellow researchers in the laboratory caught Darsee fabricating results. Braunwald denied knowledge of this academic misconduct despite two earlier accusations and his own internal investigation which found "no misleading information".

References

External links
New York Times article 1/15/1987
New York Times article 6/14/1983
Dr. Eugene Braunwald biography

1929 births
Living people
American cardiologists
Jewish emigrants from Austria to the United States after the Anschluss
University of California, San Diego faculty
Harvard Medical School faculty
New York University Grossman School of Medicine alumni
Members of the United States National Academy of Sciences
Fellows of the American College of Cardiology
Members of the National Academy of Medicine